The Arroyo Seco region has been home and inspiration to artists from Los Angeles' boom years of the 1880s to present day. This region of Northeast Los Angeles that borders the Arroyo Seco and the Los Angeles River encompasses Pasadena, Altadena, Highland Park, Garvanza, Mount Washington, and El Sereno. Historian Kevin Starr defines Arroyo Culture as "a collective designation now given to a loosely defined, scattered movement, many of whose protagonists lived, like Charles Fletcher Lummis at El Alisal, along the Arroyo Seco. 

Book designer, printer and writer Ward Ritchie described the early development of the arts and culture along Arroyo Seco as a "Southland Bohemia."

Along with writers and book artists, early painters such Elmer Wachtel and William Lees Judson lived along the Arroyo forming "an informal but discernable Arroyo School," states Starr. 

The California Art Club was founded in 1909 when a group of local artists gathered along the banks of the Arroyo Seco at the home and studio of painter Franz Bischoff to create a professional organization of painters and sculptors.

Notable artists 
Early Arroyoans artists and cultural figures:

Clyde Browne - printer, book designer
Margaret Collier Graham - writer
Alson S. Clark - painter
Alice Millard - bookseller, collector, cultural promoter
Elmer Wachtel - painter
Jean Mannheim - painter
William Lees Judson - painter, stained glass maker  
Idah Meacham Strobridge - writer, bookbinder, publisher
Charles Fletcher Lummis - writer, editor, librarian
George Wharton James - writer, editor
Franz Bischoff - painter
Ernest A. Batchelder - artist and educator
Marion Wachtel - painter
Fritz Poock - painter

Bibliography
Cloonan, Michele (2006). "Alice Millard and the Gospel of Beauty and Taste", in Women in Print : Essays on the Print Culture of American Women from the Nineteenth and Twentieth Centuries, eds. Danky and Weigand. University of Wisconsin Press.
Schenider, Nina (2014). "Under the Sign of the Sagebrush: Idah Meacham Strobridge and the Southland’s Bohemia." California State Library Foundation Bulletin, Vol. 109, pp. 2-11

Apostal, Jane. "Margaret Collier Graham: First Lady of the Foothills." Southern California Quarterly, Vol. 63, No. 4 (WINTER 1981), pp. 348-373
Apostol, Jane (2012). Collected Works. Pasadena, CA: TMA Graphics
Robert Winter, “The Arroyo Culture,” in California Design, 1910 (edited by Timothy J. Anderson, Eudorah M. Moore, and Robert W. Winter, 1980)

References

Arroyo Seco (Los Angeles County)
Art in Greater Los Angeles
Culture of Los Angeles
History of Los Angeles County, California
Northeast Los Angeles